Lacrimispora aerotolerans is an anaerobic, motile, gram-positive bacterium.

Lacrimispora aerotolerans is xylanolytic, which means that these bacteria can digest the polysaccharides collectively known as xylan. Among this species' products are formic acid, acetic acid, lactic acids, ethanol, carbon dioxide, and hydrogen.

References

External links
 
 
 Type strain of Clostridium aerotolerans at BacDive -  the Bacterial Diversity Metadatabase

Gram-positive bacteria
Bacteria described in 1987
Lachnospiraceae